Waxhaw is an unincorporated community located in Bolivar County, Mississippi, United States. It was also known as Waxhaw Plantation. Waxhaw is located on the former Yazoo and Mississippi Valley Railroad.

A post office operated under the name Waxhaw from 1927 to 1955.

The community was named after the Waxhaw people.

Notable person
Otis Clay, R&B/soul singer

References

Unincorporated communities in Bolivar County, Mississippi
Unincorporated communities in Mississippi
Mississippi populated places on the Mississippi River
Mississippi placenames of Native American origin